Lesnik was a fortified town in medieval Serbia (Rascia), registered by Byzantine Emperor Constantine Porphyrogenitus, under the rule of Časlav Klonimirović.

Serbia consisted of the following fortifications (καστρα, 'castle'): Destinikon (Δεστινίκον), Černavusk (Τςερναωουσκεή), Međurečje (Μεγυρέτονς), Dresneik (Δρεσνεηκ), Lesnik (Λεσνηκ), Salines (Σαληνέζ), in the Zhupa of Bosnia (Βοσνωνα): Katera (Κατερα) and Desnik (Δέσνηκ)."De Administrando Imperio by Constantine VII

The location is unknown, but has been connected with:
The toponym Lješnica
in Derventa, Bosnia and Herzegovina
in Tuzla, Bosnia and Herzegovina
in Kučevo, Serbia
The toponym Lešnica
in Loznica, Serbia
in Podujevo, Kosovo
The toponym Lesnica
in Trgovište, Serbia

References

Former populated places in the Balkans
Lost cities and towns
9th century in Serbia